Thomas Teryng (fl. 1414) of Lincoln, was an English politician.

He was elected a Member (MP) of the Parliament of England for Lincoln in November 1414. He was Mayor of Lincoln for 1420–21.

References

14th-century births
15th-century deaths
English MPs November 1414
Members of the Parliament of England (pre-1707) for Lincoln
Mayors of Lincoln, England